The 2014–15 LEB Oro season is the 19th season of the Liga Española de Baloncesto, the Spanish basketball second division. It is named Adecco Oro as its sponsored identity. The season will start on October 3 and will end on May 15, 17 or 19 with the last game of the promotion playoffs finals.

Competition format

Regular season
The regular season was played by round-robin system.

After the first leg of the season, the two top qualified teams played the Copa Príncipe de Asturias and the leader will be the host team.

At the final of the season:
The regular season winner promoted directly to Liga ACB.
Teams qualified between 2nd and 9th, joined the promotion play-offs to ACB. Quarterfinals will be played in a best-of-3 format and semifinals and the final in a best-of-5 one.
Only the last qualified team was relegated to LEB Plata.

Team information and location
New teams in the league
 MyWigo Valladolid (relegated from 2013–14 ACB)
 CB Prat Joventut (runner-up of the 2013–14 LEB Plata)
 Palma Air Europa (3rd qualified of 2013–14 LEB Plata, promoted after the resignation of Fundación Baloncesto Fuenlabrada)
Teams that left the league
 MoraBanc Andorra (promoted to 2014–15 ACB)
 FC Barcelona B (relegated to 2014–15 LEB Plata)

Managerial changes during the season

Regular season

League table

Results

Copa Príncipe de Asturias
At the half of the league, the two first teams in the table play the Copa Príncipe de Asturias at home of the winner of the first half season (15th round). If this team doesn't want to host the Copa Príncipe, the second qualified can do it. If nobody wants to host it, the Federation will propose a neutral venue.

The Champion of this Cup will play the play-offs as first qualified if it finishes the league between the 2nd and the 5th qualified. The Copa Príncipe will be played on January 30, 2014.

Teams qualified

|}

The game

Playoffs

Final standings

Stats leaders in regular season

Points

Rebounds

Assists

Performance Index Rating

Awards

All LEB Oro team
The all LEB Oro team was selected after the end of the playoffs.
 Mikel Uriz (MyWigo Valladolid)
 Álex Llorca (Ribeira Sacra Breogán Lugo)
 Pablo Almazán (Planasa Navarra)
 Taylor Coppenrath (Ford Burgos)
 Ricardo Guillén (Instituto de Fertilidad Clínicas Rincón)

MVP of the regular season
 Ricardo Guillén (Instituto de Fertilidad Clínicas Rincón)

Coach of the season
 Andreu Casadevall (Ford Burgos)

MVP of the week

See also
2014–15 ACB season
2014–15 LEB Plata season

References

External links
Official website

 
LEB Oro seasons

LEB2
Spain
Second level Spanish basketball league seasons